Never Let Me Go is a 1953 British adventure romance film starring Clark Gable and Gene Tierney. The picture, directed by Delmer Daves and produced by Clarence Brown, was from a screenplay by George Froeschel and Ronald Millar, based on the 1949 novel Came the Dawn by Roger Bax.

The supporting cast includes Bernard Miles, Richard Haydn, Belita, Kenneth More, Karel Štěpánek, and Theodore Bikel. The movie was shot at MGM's British Elstree Studios and on location in Cornwall. The film's sets were designed by the art director Alfred Junge.

Plot
Moscow based newspaper reporter Philip Sutherland (Clark Gable) is in love with Marya (Gene Tierney), a ballerina. He and radio broadcaster Steve Quillan (Kenneth More) go to see her perform Swan Lake with the Bolshoi Ballet, and a pleased Philip learns that Marya wishes to marry him and accompany him home to San Francisco.

They are married in the U.S. embassy, where they are warned that obtaining an exit visa is often quite difficult. On their honeymoon, they meet Christopher Denny (Richard Haydn), an Englishman married to  Marya's good friend Svetlana (Anna Valentina), who is pregnant. But when he is seen taking innocent photographs, Denny is taken into custody and banished from Russia.

Svetlana gives birth to a son in Philip and Marya's apartment. Cold War tensions are heightened, and when the Sutherlands attempt to leave, Marya is detained. Philip flies home alone and is unable to get permission to return.

He travels to London, where he and Joe Brooks (Bernard Miles), an experienced boatman, hatch a scheme to sail to Tallinn where the Bolshoi is scheduled to perform, in order to clandestinely leave with Marya. At first, he asked Christopher to sail with him so that they could also spirit away Svetlana. But, Christopher declines, as he does not want to subject his young son to the rigors of the sea.  Before sailing off, Christopher shows up at the dock ready to join the journey, explaining that his son died after becoming ill with a fever just a few weeks prior. Quillan offers to help by giving them coded instructions on his radio broadcasts as to what time they will meet Marya and Svetlana in the Gulf of Finland. At their rendezvous point, Svetlana swims out safely to the boat, but says an added ballet performance has forced Marya to stay behind.

Philip swims ashore. Stealing a medical officer's clothes, he attends the ballet. During the bows at the end of the ballet, Marya pretends to faint after seeing Philip in the audience. After examining her in a backstage room, Philip departs with her (apparently to the hospital). But, dancer Valentina Alexandrovna (Belita) recognizes him as her husband and informs the authorities. The couple flee. In the pursuit their car goes off a pier. They leap safely into the water, and swim together to the dinghy. Philip and Marya  embrace as Joe rows them to the boat.

Cast
 Clark Gable as Philip Sutherland
 Gene Tierney as Marya Lamarkina
 Bernard Miles as Joe Brooks
 Richard Haydn as Christopher Wellington St. John Denny
 Belita as Valentina Alexandrovna
 Kenneth More as Steve Quillan
 Karel Štěpánek as Commissar
 Theodore Bikel as Lieutenant
 Anna Valentina as Svetlana Mikhailovna
 Frederick Valk as Kuragin
 Peter Illing as N.K.V.D. Man
 Robert Henderson as U.S. Ambassador
 Stanley Maxted as John Barnes
 Meinhart Maur as Lemkov
 Alexis Chesnakov as General Zhdanov
 Anton Diffring as Hotel Desk Clerk (uncredited)

Reception
According to MGM records the film earned $1,482,000 in the US and Canada and $936,000 elsewhere, resulting in a loss of $86,000.

See also
 List of British films of 1953

Notes

External links

 
 
 

1953 films
1953 romantic drama films
British black-and-white films
British romantic drama films
Cold War films
1950s English-language films
Films based on British novels
Films based on romance novels
Films directed by Delmer Daves
Films set in the Soviet Union
Metro-Goldwyn-Mayer films
Films shot at MGM-British Studios
1950s British films